Henry Coutts (14 November 1866 – 30 April 1944) was a New Zealand cricketer and soldier. He played three first-class matches for Taranaki between 1882 and 1892. During the Second Boer War he was one of only eight soldiers to be awarded the Queen's Scarf for bravery. He also served in the First World War.

See also
 List of Taranaki representative cricketers

References

External links
 
 The Queen's Scarf awarded to Henry Coutts at Te Ara: The Encyclopedia of New Zealand

1866 births
1944 deaths
New Zealand cricketers
Taranaki cricketers
Sportspeople from Canterbury
New Zealand military personnel of the Second Boer War
New Zealand military personnel of World War I